Emmanuel C. Bickel House is a historic home located at Elkhart, Elkhart County, Indiana.  It was built about 1870, and is a two-story, "T"-plan, Carpenter Gothic style balloon frame dwelling.  It features a wraparound porch with a flat roof, decorative scrollwork, and eight bracketed square columns.

It was added to the National Register of Historic Places in 1979.

References

Houses on the National Register of Historic Places in Indiana
Gothic Revival architecture in Indiana
Houses completed in 1870
Houses in Elkhart County, Indiana
National Register of Historic Places in Elkhart County, Indiana
Buildings and structures in Elkhart, Indiana